Joe Bachie (born February 26, 1998) is an American football linebacker for the Cincinnati Bengals of the National Football League (NFL). He played college football at Michigan State. He has also played for the New Orleans Saints and the Philadelphia Eagles.

College career
Bachie was a member of the Michigan State Spartans for four seasons. He tested positive for a banned performance-enhancing substance during his senior season, ending his collegiate career prematurely. In eight games, Bachie recorded 71 tackles, 8.5 tackles for loss and 3.5 sacks with four passes defended and an interception and was named third-team All-Big Ten by the media. Bachie finished his collegiate career with 285 tackles, 27.5 tackles for loss and eight sacks with five interceptions, 11 passes broken up, five forced fumbles, and two fumble recoveries in 40 games played.

Professional career

New Orleans Saints
Bachie was signed by the New Orleans Saints as an undrafted free agent on May 13, 2020. He was waived on September 5, 2020, during final roster cuts and was signed to the Saints practice squad the following day.

Philadelphia Eagles
On December 7, 2020, Bachie was signed by the Philadelphia Eagles off the Saints practice squad. He was waived on May 25, 2021.

Cincinnati Bengals
On May 26, 2021, Bachie was claimed off waivers by the Cincinnati Bengals. He was waived on August 31, 2021 and re-signed to the practice squad the next day. Bachie was promoted to the Bengals' active roster on October 16 and saw his first game action against the Detroit Lions. He was signed to the active roster on October 26. He was placed on injured reserve on December 21, after suffering a knee injury in Week 14.

On March 11, 2022, Bachie re-signed with the Bengals on a one-year deal.

On August 30, 2022, Bachie was placed on the reserve/PUP list to start the season. He was activated on October 22.

References

External links
Michigan State Spartans bio
Philadelphia Eagles bio

1998 births
Living people
American football linebackers
Cincinnati Bengals players
Michigan State Spartans football players
New Orleans Saints players
Philadelphia Eagles players
Players of American football from Ohio
Sportspeople from Cuyahoga County, Ohio